Noraseela Mohd Khalid (born 27 September 1979) is a Malaysian athlete who specialises in the 400 metres hurdles. Her personal best is 56.02 seconds, achieved in June 2006 in Regensburg.

She won the bronze medal at the 2000 Asian Championships, finished sixth at the 2003 Summer Universiade, fourth at the 2003 Asian Championships, won the silver medal at the 2005 Asian Championships, finished sixth at the 2006 Commonwealth Games and won the bronze medal at the 2006 Asian Games. She also competed at the World Championships in 2001 and 2005 without reaching the final.

Achievements

References

External links

Malaysian female hurdlers
Malaysian people of Malay descent
1979 births
Living people
Asian Games medalists in athletics (track and field)
Athletes (track and field) at the 2012 Summer Olympics
Olympic athletes of Malaysia
Athletes (track and field) at the 2006 Asian Games
Athletes (track and field) at the 2010 Asian Games
Asian Games bronze medalists for Malaysia
Southeast Asian Games medalists in athletics
Southeast Asian Games gold medalists for Malaysia
Southeast Asian Games silver medalists for Malaysia
Southeast Asian Games bronze medalists for Malaysia
Medalists at the 2006 Asian Games
Competitors at the 1999 Southeast Asian Games
Competitors at the 2001 Southeast Asian Games
Competitors at the 2003 Southeast Asian Games
Competitors at the 2009 Southeast Asian Games
Competitors at the 2011 Southeast Asian Games
Athletes (track and field) at the 2006 Commonwealth Games
Commonwealth Games competitors for Malaysia